Yavgeniya Khatskevich (born 29 June 1993) is a Kazakhstani footballer who plays as a forward. She has been a member of the Kazakhstan women's national team.

References

1993 births
Living people
Women's association football forwards
Kazakhstani women's footballers
Kazakhstan women's international footballers